Armstrong Lake is a lake in Blue Earth County, Minnesota, in the United States.

Armstrong Lake was named for John Armstrong, an early settler.

References

Lakes of Minnesota
Lakes of Blue Earth County, Minnesota